Martín Prest is a former Argentine football striker. He was born on November 30, 1978, in the city of Mar del Plata in the Buenos Aires Province of  Argentina. He last played for Atletico Vieste before retiring.

Prest played for a selection of lower league teams in Scotland and Spain before joining Maritimo in 2006.

Honours
Airdrieonians
Scottish Challenge Cup: 2000–01

References

External links
 
 Martín Prest Interview

Argentine footballers
Argentine expatriate footballers
Argentine expatriate sportspeople in Spain
Naturalised citizens of Spain
Association football forwards
Dundee F.C. players
Ross County F.C. players
Raith Rovers F.C. players
C.S. Marítimo players
Sportspeople from Mar del Plata
1978 births
Living people
Burgos CF footballers
Airdrieonians F.C. (1878) players
Scottish Football League players
Primeira Liga players
Segunda División B players
Expatriate footballers in Scotland
Expatriate footballers in Portugal
CU Collado Villalba players